St Leonard's Hospital is a hospital in Hackney, North London.

History
The hospital was founded as the infirmary for the St Leonard’s Shoreditch Workhouse in 1777. The workhouse was rebuilt between 1863 and 1866 and the infirmary was rebuilt in 1872. Edith Cavell served as Assistant Matron at the hospital from 1903 to 1906. It had become known as St Leonard's Hospital by 1920 and came under the management of London County Council in 1930. It was the first hospital to receive casualties during the Blitz and then joined the National Health Service in 1948.

Although the hospital was the subject of a workers’ occupation aiming to keep the hospital open in July 1984, it ceased to operate a general hospital later that year. Nevertheless the building continues to provide services on behalf of  Homerton University Hospital NHS Foundation Trust.

See also
 List of hospitals in England

References

1777 establishments in England
Poor law infirmaries